Carlisle United have had over 40 managers since the club was founded in 1904. Amongst others they include Bill Shankly, a former United player who went on to make Liverpool Football League champions three times, Alan Ashman, who took Carlisle to the top of The Football League and Michael Knighton who in 1997 took over the management role while he was chairman.

Managerial history 
Information correct as of 17 January 2019.
(n/a) = Information not available

Notes and references

Managers
 
Carlisle United